The discography of Albanian-born Greek singer Eleni Foureira consists of five studio albums, one extended-play, thirty-five singles (including six as a featured artist) and twenty-nine music videos.

Albums

Reissues

Extended plays

Singles

As lead artist

As featured artist 

1. Tranquila feat. Eleni Foureira charted in Latin America in the following spots; Mexico #74, Chile #122, Argentina #138, Peru #141, Ecuador #150.
2. Sirens feat. Snoop Dogg & Eleni Foureira charted in the International iTunes Chart #132, as well as Germany #18 & Austria #44.

Promotional singles

Other charted and certified songs

Videos

Music Videos

Lyric Videos

Live Performances 

(*)further, Eleni is cited as performer on Spanish wikipage: https://es.wikipedia.org/wiki/Programas_especiales_de_La_1_en_Nochevieja

References

Discographies of Greek artists
Discographies of Albanian artists
Pop music discographies